Efrain Daniel Contreras (born February 6, 1987) is a Venezuelan professional baseball outfielder for the Lake Country DockHounds of the American Association of Professional Baseball.

Contreras was selected to the roster for the Colombia national baseball team at the 2015 Pan American Games, 2016 South American Championships, 2017 World Baseball Classic, 2019 Pan American Games Qualifier, and 2019 Pan American Games.

References

External links

1987 births
Living people
Baseball outfielders
Billings Mustangs players
Cagua players
Caribes de Anzoátegui players
Dayton Dragons players
Dominican Summer League Reds players
Venezuelan expatriate baseball players in the Dominican Republic
Gulf Coast Reds players
Lynchburg Hillcats players
Sportspeople from Maracay
Sarasota Reds players
Venezuelan expatriate baseball players in the United States
Venezuelan people of Colombian descent
Venezuelan Summer League Devil Rays/Reds players
Venezuelan Summer League Reds players
2017 World Baseball Classic players
Baseball players at the 2019 Pan American Games
Pan American Games competitors for Colombia
Baseball players at the 2015 Pan American Games